The Culicoidea are a superfamily within the order Diptera.  The following families are included within the Culicoidea:

Dixidae – meniscus midges
Corethrellidae – frog-biting midges
Chaoboridae – phantom midges
Culicidae – mosquitoes

References

McAlpine, J.F., B.V. Peterson, G.E. Shewell, H.J. Teskey, J.R. Vockeroth, and D.M. Wood. Manual of Nearctic Diptera, Volume 1. Agriculture Canada Monograph 27.1981.

 
Diptera superfamilies